Apollon XI was an Epirotiki Lines cruise ship, which was named after both the Greek sun god Apollo and the Apollo 11 mission that landed the first humans on the Moon.

Initially it was built as a passenger ship under the name Irish Coast for Coast Lines Ltd, Glasgow. She was chartered by Burns & Laird Lines Ltd. for the service between Belfast and Liverpool, also from Cork to Fishguard, Dublin to Liverpool and for the service Glasgow - Dublin - Liverpool. 

In 1968 she was acquired by Epirotiki and changed several names (Orpheus in 1968, then Semiramis II and Achilleus in 1969) until she took the final name Apollon XI (or Apollon 11) and was rebuilt as a cruise ship. She was used for cruises in the Aegean Sea, in the Mediterranean Sea, in the Antilles (Caribbean Sea) and in Africa. In 1982 she was renamed to Regency. On 11 October 1989, she ran aground due to the typhoon Dan and was subsequently towed to Manila (Philippines) for demolition.

The Apollon XI and another Epirotiki ship, the MTS Oceanos, were featured in the 1986 film Hardbodies 2.

External links
M/S Irish Coast, on Micke Asklander's ship data website (in Swedish)
Ship data on the Wreck Site
Irish Coast in Geoff Topp's postcard collection
Apollo official Epirotiki postcard on the website of Simplon Postcards
Apollon 11 around 1970.
1952 ships
Cruise ships
Ships built in Belfast
Ships built by Harland and Wolff
Maritime incidents in 1989
1989 in the Philippines
1952 in Northern Ireland